Pape Maguette Kebe (born 28 December 1979) is a Senegalese former professional footballer who played as a defender.

Career
Kebe began his career at ASC Diaraf and played one game in the Russian Premier League on loan for FC Rubin Kazan.

Personal life
He is the younger brother of Kébé Baye.

Honours
 Russian Premier League bronze: 2003

References

Living people
1979 births
Footballers from Dakar
Senegalese footballers
Association football defenders
Serer sportspeople
Russian Premier League players
ASC Jaraaf players
FC Rubin Kazan players
Senegalese expatriate footballers
Senegalese expatriate sportspeople in Russia
Expatriate footballers in Russia